Cyma may refer to either:

 An S-shaped decorative molding, used in the cymatium of Greek architecture
 CYMA – Canadian Youth Mission to Armenia, a Canadian-run humanitarian program
 CYMA (software), accounting packages
 Cyma Watches, a Swiss watch-making company
 Cyma Zarghami, the president of Nickelodeon and MTV Networks' Kids & Family Group
 The ICAO code for Mayo Airport